This article shows the rosters of all participating teams at the 2018 FIVB Volleyball Men's Club World Championship in Poland.

Pool A

PGE Skra Bełchatów
The following is the roster of the Polish club PGE Skra Bełchatów in the 2018 FIVB Volleyball Men's Club World Championship.

 Head coach:  Roberto Piazza

Fakel Novy Urengoy
The following is the roster of the Russian club Fakel Novy Urengoy in the 2018 FIVB Volleyball Men's Club World Championship.

 Head coach:  Camillo Placì

Cucine Lube Civitanova
The following is the roster of the Italian club Cucine Lube Civitanova in the 2018 FIVB Volleyball Men's Club World Championship.

 Head coach:  Giampaolo Medei

Zenit Kazan
The following is the roster of the Russian club Zenit Kazan in the 2018 FIVB Volleyball Men's Club World Championship.

 Head coach:  Vladimir Alekno

Pool B

Khatam Ardakan
The following is the roster of the Iranian club Khatam Ardakan in the 2018 FIVB Volleyball Men's Club World Championship.

 Head coach:  Mohammad Reza Salek

Asseco Resovia Rzeszów
The following is the roster of the Polish club Asseco Resovia Rzeszów in the 2018 FIVB Volleyball Men's Club World Championship.

 Head coach:  Gheorghe Crețu

Sada Cruzeiro
The following is the roster of the Brazilian club Sada Cruzeiro in the 2018 FIVB Volleyball Men's Club World Championship.

 Head coach:  Marcelo Méndez

Trentino Volley
The following is the roster of the Italian club Trentino Volley in the 2018 FIVB Volleyball Men's Club World Championship.

 Head coach:  Angelo Lorenzetti

References

External links
Official website

FIVB Club World Championship squads
FIVB Volleyball Men's Club World Championship squads